James "Jim" Lamb Clampitt (third ¼ 1881 – first ¼ 1934) was an English professional rugby league footballer who played in the 1900s and 1910s. He played at representative level for Great Britain, England and Cumberland, and at club level for Broughton Rangers, as a forward (prior to the specialist positions of), during the era of contested scrums.

Background
James Clampitt's birth was registered in Bootle district, Cumberland, and his death aged 52 was registered in Salford, Lancashire, England.

Playing career

International honours
While at Broughton Rangers Clampitt won caps for Great Britain in 1908 in the third Test match of the 1907–1908 New Zealand rugby tour of Australia and Great Britain, and again in 1911 against Australia, and he won caps for England in 1909 against Wales. He was considered a "Probable" for the 1910 Great Britain Lions tour of Australia and New Zealand, but ultimately he was not selected for the tour.

He represented England in 1911 against Wales, and Australia, in 1912 against Wales, in 1913 against Wales, in 1914 against Wales. Following the 1913–14 Northern Rugby Football Union season, Clampitt was selected to go on the 1914 Great Britain Lions tour of Australia and New Zealand, playing one Test match against New Zealand.

Challenge Cup Final appearances
Jim Clampitt played as a forward, i.e. number 12, in Broughton Rangers' 4-0 victory over Wigan in the 1911 Challenge Cup Final during the 1910–11 season at The Willows, Salford, in front of a crowd of 15,006.

References

External links

1881 births
1934 deaths
Broughton Rangers players
England national rugby league team players
English rugby league players
Great Britain national rugby league team players
People from Bootle, Cumbria
Rugby league forwards
Rugby league players from Cumbria